The following are the 75 municipalities of the canton of St. Gallen,.

List 

 Altstätten
 Amden
 Andwil
 Au, St. Gallen
 Bad Ragaz
 Balgach
 Benken, St. Gallen
 Berg, St. Gallen
 Berneck
 Buchs, St. Gallen
 Bütschwil-Ganterschwil
 Degersheim
 Diepoldsau
 Ebnat-Kappel
 Eggersriet
 Eichberg
 Eschenbach, St. Gallen
 Flawil
 Flums
 Gaiserwald
 Gams
 Goldach
 Gommiswald
 Gossau, St. Gallen
 Grabs
 Häggenschwil
 Jonschwil
 Kaltbrunn
 Kirchberg, St. Gallen
 Lichtensteig
 Lütisburg
 Marbach, St. Gallen
 Mels
 Mörschwil
 Mosnang
 Muolen
 Neckertal
 Nesslau
 Niederbüren
 Niederhelfenschwil
 Oberbüren
 Oberriet
 Oberuzwil
 Pfäfers
 Quarten
 Rapperswil-Jona
 Rebstein
 Rheineck
 Rorschach
 Rorschacherberg
 Rüthi
 Sargans
 Schänis
 Schmerikon
 Sennwald
 Sevelen
 St. Gallen
 St. Margrethen
 Steinach
 Thal
 Tübach
 Untereggen
 Uznach
 Uzwil
 Vilters-Wangs
 Waldkirch
 Walenstadt
 Wartau
 Wattwil
 Weesen
 Widnau
 Wil, St. Gallen
 Wildhaus-Alt St. Johann
 Wittenbach
 Zuzwil, St. Gallen

References

 
Subdivisions of the canton of St. Gallen
St. Gallen